Stoichkov is a Bulgarian surname. It may refer to:

Zdravko Stoichkov (born 1964), Bulgarian weightlifter
Hristo Stoichkov (born 1966), Bulgarian footballer
Juan Diego Molina Martínez (born 1993), nicknamed Stoichkov, Spanish footballer
Georgi Stoichkov (born 1994), Bulgarian footballer
Toni Stoichkov (born 1995), Bulgarian footballer

Bulgarian-language surnames